Calgary North was a federal electoral district in Alberta, Canada, that was represented in the House of Commons of Canada from 1953 to 1997.

This riding was created in 1952 from parts of the Bow River, Calgary West and East Calgary ridings.

The electoral district was abolished in 1996 when it was merged into Calgary—Nose Hill.

Election results

See also 
 List of Canadian federal electoral districts
 Past Canadian electoral districts

External links 
 

Former federal electoral districts of Alberta